Centro Memoria is a station that is part of the mass transit system of Bogotá, TransMilenio.

Location 
It is located in the center of the city, on the Avenida El Dorado between races 19B and 23. It is accessed by means of a traffic light crossing located on the Carrera 19B and by a bridge Pedestrian street located on Carrera 24 (north side); Carrera 25 (south side).

Serves the demand of the neighborhoods, Santa Fe, Florida, La Estrella and environs.

Nearby are the Central Cemetery, the Renaissance Park, the Roberto Arias Perez Theater and the supermarket Calle Colsubsidio.

Etymology 
The station receives its name from the Center of Memory, Peace and Reconciliation, built in a lot diagonal to the station. Initially it was called Renaissance Park.

Story 
This station is part of Phase III of TransMilenio that began to be constructed in the end of 2009 and, after several delays related to cases of corruption, was delivered the August 6 of 2012.

Current Trunk Services

Feeder routes
This station does not have connections to feeder routes.

Inter-city service
This station does not have inter-city service.

See also
 List of TransMilenio Stations

References

TransMilenio